Blaine is an unincorporated community in northern Pease Township, Belmont County, Ohio, United States, along Wheeling Creek.  It has a post office with the ZIP code 43909.

Blaine is part of the Wheeling, WV-OH Metropolitan Statistical Area.

The community was named after James G. Blaine.

Notable person
 Phil Niekro, Baseball Hall of Fame pitcher

References

Unincorporated communities in Belmont County, Ohio
Unincorporated communities in Ohio